The 2000 Laurence Olivier Awards were held in 2000 in London celebrating excellence in West End theatre by the Society of London Theatre.

Winners and nominees
Details of winners (in bold) and nominees, in each award category, per the Society of London Theatre.

Productions with multiple nominations and awards
The following 23 productions, including two operas, received multiple nominations:

 8: Spend, Spend, Spend and The Lion King
 6: Candide
 4: Mamma Mia, Summerfolk and The Real Thing
 3: Money, The Merchant of Venice, The Winter's Tale and Troilus and Cressida
 2: Animal Crackers, Collected Stories, Comic Potential, Parsifal, Plenty, Richard III, Semele, Soul Train, The Forest, The Lady in the Van, The Memory of Water, Vassa and Viktor

The following seven productions received multiple awards:

 2: Candide, Money, Spend, Spend, Spend, The Lion King, The Merchant of Venice, Troilus and Cressida and Vassa

See also
 54th Tony Awards

References

External links
 Previous Olivier Winners – 2000

Laurence Olivier Awards ceremonies
Laurence Olivier Awards, 2000
2000 in London
Laur